Coville is a surname. Notable people with the surname include:

 Bruce Coville (born 1950), American author of young-adult fiction
 Christopher Coville (born 1945), British retired senior Royal Air Force commander
 Frederick Vernon Coville (1867–1937), American botanist